Tetropismenus is a genus of picture-winged flies in the family Ulidiidae.

Species
 T. hirtus

References

Ulidiidae